Lambton—Middlesex is a federal electoral district represented in the House of Commons of Canada from 1979 to 1997. It was located in the province of Ontario. This riding was created in 1976 from parts of Huron—Middlesex, Lambton—Kent, Middlesex—London—Lambton and Sarnia—Lambton ridings.

It was initially defined as consisting of

(a) the County of Lambton, excluding the Townships of Moore and Sarnia and any part of the county west of them, and the Township of Moore, and any part of the county north of it, Indian Reserve No. 46, and 
(b) the part of the County of Middlesex west of the Townships of Biddulph, London and Westminster.

In 1987, it was redefined to consist of

(a) the County of Lambton excluding the City of Sarnia, the Village of Point Edward, the townships of Moore and Sarnia, Sarnia Indian Reserve No. 45 and Walpole Island Indian Reserve No. 46; and
(b) that part of the County of Middlesex west of and including the Townships of McGillivray, Lobo and Delaware.

The electoral district was abolished in 1996 when it was redistributed between Elgin—Middlesex—London, Lambton—Kent—Middlesex, London West, Perth—Middlesex, and Sarnia—Lambton ridings.

Members of Parliament

This riding has elected the following Members of Parliament:

Electoral history

See also 

 List of Canadian federal electoral districts
 Past Canadian electoral districts

External links 

 Parliamentary website

Former federal electoral districts of Ontario